Cynthia J. Burrows is an American chemist, currently a Distinguished Professor in the Department of Chemistry at the University of Utah, where she is also the Thatcher Presidential Endowed Chair of Biological Chemistry. Burrows was the Senior Editor of the Journal of Organic Chemistry (2001-2013) and became Editor-in-Chief of Accounts of Chemical Research in 2014.,

Education and training 
Burrows acquired a B.A. degree in Chemistry at the University of Colorado (1975). There she worked on Stern-Volmer plots in Stanley Cristol's laboratory during her senior year. She continued to study physical organic chemistry at Cornell University, where she received a Ph.D. degree in Chemistry in 1982 working in Barry Carpenter's laboratory. Her Ph.D. thesis work focused on cyano-substituted allyl vinyl ethers. Burrows then conducted a short post-doctoral research stint with Jean-Marie Lehn in Strasbourg, France.

Career and research 
The Burrows laboratory is interested in nucleic acid chemistry, DNA sequencing technology, and DNA damage. Her research team (consisting of organic, biological, analytical and inorganic chemists) focuses on chemical processes that result in the formation of mutations, which could lead to diseases (such as cancer). Her work includes studying site-specifically modified DNA and RNA strands and DNA-protein cross linking.  Burrows and her group are widely known for expanding the studies on nanopore technology by developing a method for detecting DNA damage using a nanopore., 

One of the objectives of the Burrows Laboratory is to apply nanopore technology to identify, quantify, and analyze DNA damage brought on by oxidative stresses. Burrows focuses on the damage found in human telomeric sequences, crucial chromosomal regions that provide protection from degradation and are subject to problems during DNA replication. Additionally, Burrows’ research in altering nucleic acid composition can provide valuable information in genetic diseases as well as manipulating the function of DNA and RNA in cells.

Nanopore detection of DNA damage 

Nanopore technology is significant in analysis of biological macromolecules such as DNA and RNA because it can detect minute sample quantities and bypasses the need for PCR amplification. PCR amplification and other DNA sequencing methods cannot detect DNA damage alone because their basis relies on the four classical unmodified bases: cytosine, adenine, guanine, and thymine. One of the most common and prevalent causes of DNA damage is oxidation of guanine residues to 8-oxoguanine brought on through oxidative stresses. 8-oxoguanine causes mismatch pairing with adenine as opposed to cytosine, which can ultimately cause point mutations during DNA replication. In the context of DNA-protein cross linking, 8-oxoguanine is susceptible to forming adducts with amino acids containing reactive groups such as the phenol moiety of tyrosine or terminal amine of lysine., Detection and quantification of 8-oxoguanine content in telomeric sequences is important because content increases with stress since telomeres escape cellular DNA repair mechanisms. Burrows helped to discover specific DNA glycosylases that preferentially repaired oxidative damages at telomeric sites.

Nanopore technology relies on passing a constant electric current through a nanoscale hole immersed in an electrolytic solution. Molecules that pass through or disrupt the current by blocking the pore will generate a detectable signal when measuring current versus time. Nanopores can range from solid-state constructs to small proteins. To examine the extent of damage in G-quadruplexes of telomeres, Burrows used a protein α-hemolysin, which contains a nanoscale tube core and is embedded in the cell membrane. Damaged bases are oxidatively marked with a crown ether to amplify the current signal as well as to reduce the mitigating effects of 8-oxoguanine on the native fold. As the DNA strand passes through, the marked damaged base produces a characteristic signal as it disrupts the applied current.

Awards and honors 
Awards and honors include:
 NSF - CNRS Exchange of Scientists Fellowship, 1981–82
 Japan Soc. for the Promotion of Science Research Fellow, 1989–90
 NSF Creativity Award, 1993–95
 NSF Career Advancement Award, 1993–94
 Bioorganic & Natural Products Study Section, NIH, 1990–94
 NSF Math & Physical Sciences Advisory Committee, 2005–08
 Assoc. Editor, Organic Letters, 1999–2002
 Senior Editor, Journal of Organic Chemistry, 2001–13
 Robert W. Parry Teaching Award, 2002
 ACS Utah Award, 2000
 Bea Singer Award, 2004
 Fellow, AAAS, 2004
 Distinguished Scholarly and Creative Research Award, Univ. of Utah, 2005
 Cope Scholar Award, American Chemical Society, 2008
 Director, USTAR Governing Authority, 2009-2017
 Member, American Academy of Arts and Sciences, 2009
 ACS Fellow, 2010
 Distinguished Teaching Award, 2011
 Editor-in-Chief, Accounts of Chemical Research, 2014
 Linda K. Amos Award for Distinguished Service to Women of U of U, 2014
 Member, National Academy of Science, 2014
 ACS James Flack Norris Award in Physical Organic Chemistry, 2018
 Willard Gibbs Award, 2018

References 

Year of birth missing (living people)
Living people
21st-century American chemists
University of Colorado alumni
Cornell University alumni
University of Utah faculty
Fellows of the American Association for the Advancement of Science
Members of the United States National Academy of Sciences
Fellows of the American Academy of Arts and Sciences
Fellows of the American Chemical Society
American women chemists
American women academics
21st-century American women scientists